McCollum is a surname. Notable people with the surname include:

Allan McCollum (1944–present), American artist
Anquell McCollum (born 1973), American college basketball coach
Betty L. McCollum, Minnesota Representative (1954–present) 
Bill McCollum (1944–present), American politician
CJ McCollum, American basketball player
Darius McCollum (1965–present), American transit operator impostor
Elmer McCollum, biochemist and historian
Parker McCollum (born 1992), American Americana and country singer-songwriter 
Miles Parks McCollum or Lil Yachty, American rapper
Rick McCollum, painter
Robert McCollum, American voice actor
Ronnie McCollum (born 1978), American professional basketball player
Ryan McCollum (born 1998), American football player
Vashti McCollum, plaintiff in landmark U.S. Supreme Court case involving separation of church and state (1912–2006)
Zyon McCollum (born 1999), American football player

See also
McCallum (surname)